Luard is a surname, and may refer to:

 Caroline Mary Luard (d.1908) Murder victim
 Charles Luard (1867–1947) Commander of British troops in China
 Evan Luard (1926–1991) British Labour politician
 Henry Richards Luard (1825–1891) British antiquarian
 John Luard  (1790–1875), British Army officer
 Kate Evelyn Luard (1872-1962), British nurse
 Nicholas Luard (1937–2004) British actor and writer
 Richard Luard (1827–1891) British army officer
 William Luard (1820–1910) British naval commander

See also:
Luard Road, Luard Case, Luard  Islands